Land Authority for Wales (LAW) was an executive agency of the UK Government.

History 

The Land Authority for Wales was established in 1976 under the Community Land Act 1975. Its role was to buy land on behalf of the UK Government for industrial or other forms of development in order to encourage economic growth. Authority was abolished in 1999 under Government of Wales Act 1998 and its functions passed to the Welsh Development Agency.

References 

Economy of Wales
Defunct public bodies of the United Kingdom